Fabrizio Bertot (born 23 February 1967, Torino) is an Italian politician, member of the European Parliament from 12 April 2013 to 30 June 2014 for the Berlusconi's party PDL (later FI). Ukraine, on 2 May 2018, has forbidden Bertot entry for three years with blocking of the right to dispose of assets and the property belonging. From 2003 to 2012 he was the Major of Rivarolo Canavese for the centre-right coalition.

References 

Living people
1967 births
MEPs for Italy 2009–2014
21st-century Italian politicians
European People's Party MEPs
Rivarolo Canavese